Withernsea Community Hospital is a health facility in Queen Street, Withernsea, East Riding of Yorkshire, England. It is managed by Humber Teaching NHS Foundation Trust.

History
The facility was procured under a private finance initiative contract in January 1998. The hospital, which was built by SOL Construction at a cost of £2.5 million, opened in November 1998. Ward admissions were suspended because of resourcing issues in August 2017.

References

Hospital buildings completed in 1998
Hospitals established in 1998
Hospitals in the East Riding of Yorkshire
NHS hospitals in England
1998 establishments in England
Withernsea